Jack Behrens (born 25 March 1935) is a Canadian composer, music educator, and writer of American birth. A member of the Canadian League of Composers and an associate of the Canadian Music Centre, his music has been performed throughout North America and on CBC Radio and radio stations in the United States. In 1970 his orchestral work The Sound of Milo won first prize in the New Orleans Symphony contest and his choral work How Beautiful is the Night was awarded the Francis Boott Prize at Harvard University. He was married to the late Canadian pianist Sonja Peterson Behrens.

Life and career
Born in Lancaster, Pennsylvania, Behrens was trained at the Juilliard School where he earned a Bachelor of Music in 1958 and a Master of Music in 1959. Among his teachers at Juilliard were William Bergsma, Vincent Persichetti, and Peter Mennin. In the summer of 1962 he studied at the Aspen Music Festival and School with Darius Milhaud and in the summers of 1964–1965 he studied with Stefan Wolpe and John Cage at the Emma Lake Composers-Artists Workshop in Saskatchewan. He later entered the graduate composition program at Harvard University where he earned a Doctor of Philosophy in music composition in 1973. His teachers at Harvard were Leon Kirchner and Roger Sessions.

In 1962 Behrens joined the music faculty at the University of Saskatchewan where he was head of the theory department through 1966. He worked on the music faculty at Simon Fraser University from 1966–1970 and then taught at California State University from 1970–1976. From 1976–1980 he was chairman of the music theory and composition department at the University of Western Ontario (UWO), and then served as the dean of UWO's music faculty from 1980–1986. Following his retirement from Western, Behrens was active at Toronto's Royal Conservatory of Music  (RCM) as Director of Academic Studies at The Glenn Gould School.

Behrens has received commissions from Adele Marcus, the Canadian Broadcasting Corporation, the Ontario Arts Council, and Orchestra London among others. In 1965 the Canada Council commissioned his chamber opera The Lay of Thrym (libretto by C.K. Cockburn) as part of their research program on Viking literature, art, and music in Scandinavian countries. The four-scene opera is based on an Icelandic legend and employs atonality and aleatoric and improvisational techniques. The world premiere of the opera was given at Darke Hall on 13 April 1968 under the baton of the composer.

Behrens is the subject of international research by flautist Rebecca Hall, of the University of Malta, and Karin Di Bella of Brock University in Ontario. In January 2019, Di Bella was quoted as saying "What’s interesting about Jack’s pieces is that even though they’re more modern in style, they’re still really accessible."

External links

References

Living people
1935 births
American male classical composers
American opera composers
American music educators
American emigrants to Canada
Canadian classical composers
Canadian music educators
Male opera composers
Aspen Music Festival and School alumni
California State University faculty
Harvard Graduate School of Arts and Sciences alumni
Juilliard School alumni
Academic staff of Simon Fraser University
Academic staff of the University of Saskatchewan
Academic staff of the University of Western Ontario
Pupils of Darius Milhaud
Pupils of Roger Sessions